The 2001 Protection One 400 was a NASCAR Winston Cup Series stock car race held on September 30, 2001, at Kansas Speedway in Kansas City, Kansas. The race was the 28th of the 2001 NASCAR Winston Cup Series season. The race was the inaugural Cup race held at the  track. Penske Racing's Rusty Wallace led the most laps with 117, while Jeff Gordon of Hendrick Motorsports won the race.

Due to the September 11 attacks happening earlier in the month, the Federal Aviation Administration (FAA) ordered a no-fly zone, prohibiting aircraft from flying within three miles of any sporting event area, which also includes an altitude of 300 feet. To increase security, coolers and large bags were banned from the track, while other items like purses and binoculars were subject to inspection. Meanwhile, in a sense of patriotism after the attacks, Sterling Marlin ran a "God Bless America" paint scheme, which had not been prepared in time for the 2001 MBNA Cal Ripken Jr. 400 the week before. To support victims of the attacks, Marlin's sponsor Coors Brewing Company donated $10 for every lap completed at the race by Marlin.

Entry list

Qualifying

Race recap
The race was filled with caution flags; the first caution flag flew on the first lap, when John Andretti and Ricky Craven made contact in turn 2. A total of 13 caution flags were flown along with 70 laps were run under caution, both track highs, and a red flag stopped the race for eleven minutes. Meanwhile, Wallace dominated the race, leading a race-high 117 laps. However, he was eventually penalized for speeding on the pit road. Gordon then took the lead and held off Ryan Newman for his sixth win of the season, also giving him a 222-point advantage over Ricky Rudd in the championship standings. Rudd, Wallace, and Sterling Marlin closed out the top five.

Results

Standings after the race

References

Protection One 400
Protection One 400
NASCAR races at Kansas Speedway